is a Japanese computer game and manga magazine published by Kadokawa Shoten. Comp Ace began as a special edition version of another one of Kadokawa Shoten's magazines, Comptiq. The first issue was released on March 26, 2005, and was published quarterly for the first three volumes which had cover illustrations by Itaru Hinoue of Key. Volumes four through nine were published bimonthly with cover art provided by Aoi Nishimata of Navel. Volume ten was published three months after volume nine, and from ten on the magazine was published monthly, now with new cover art by Naru Nanao, Hiro Suzuhira, and illustrators from Type-Moon and August. Starting with the August 2007 issue published on June 26, 2007, Comp Ace broke off from Comptiq and became its own magazine. Its main focus is on bishōjo games and manga that are based on said games.

Serialized manga
11eyes: Tsumi to Batsu to Aganai no Shōjo
_Summer
Aiyoku no Eustia
Akaneiro ni Somaru Saka
Akira's Ambition
Alice Quartet Obbligato
Angel Magister
Ao no Kanata no Four Rhythm
AR Forgotten summer
Arcana Heart
Baldr Sky
Basquash! Eclipse Stage
Battle Cinder-Ella-
Canaan
Canvas 2 ~Niji Iro no Sketch~
Cardfight!! Vanguard
Clear
Code Geass - Knightmare of Nunnally
Cross Days
Da Capo III
Dahlia in Bloom
Eve: New Generation
FairlyLife
Fantasista Doll
Fate/Extra CCC Foxtail
Fate/kaleid liner Prisma Illya
Fate/kaleid liner Prisma Illya 2wei!
Fate/kaleid liner Prisma Illya 3rei!!
Festa!! -Hyper Girls Pop-
Fukanzen Shinsei Kikan Iris
H2O: Footprints in the Sand
Hatsune Miku: Mikubon
Hatsuyuki Sakura
Hana no Miyako!
Hibiki's Magic
Higurashi no Naku Koro ni - Onisarashi-hen and Utsutsukowashi-hen arcs
Hoshiuta
HR
Hybrid x Heart Magias Academy Ataraxia
Idolmaster: Xenoglossia
In Search of the Lost Future
Kantai Collection: Seamine Squadron Chronicles
Kono Aozora ni Yakusoku o: Melody of the Sun and Sea
Kiddy Girl-and Pure
Kimi ga Aruji de Shitsuji ga Ore de
Little Busters!
Lucky Star
Macross Frontier
Magical Girl Lyrical Nanoha ViVid
Magical Girl Lyrical Nanoha Innocent
Mahō Shōjo Ikusei Keikaku
Maji de Watashi ni Koishinasai!
Maoyū Maō Yūsha - "Kono Watashi no Mono Tonare, Yuusha Yo" "Kotowaru!"
Mashiroiro Symphony
Melty Blood
Miniten: Happy Project
Munto
Musō Tōrō
Ninja Slayer: Machine of Vengeance
Oretachi ni Tsubasa wa Nai: Rhapsody
Over Lord
Rental Magica from Solomon
Sakura no Uta
School Days
Stellar Theater
Strike Witches
Strange and Bright Nature Deity
SweetHoneyComing
Tantei Opera Milky Holmes
Tayutama: Kiss on my Deity
Tengen Toppa Gurren Lagann: Gurren Gakuen-hen
Tick! Tack!: Never Say Goodbye
Touhou Suzunaan: Forbidden Scrollery
Tsuyokiss
Utsūtsuhi de Onikki
Valkyria Chronicles
Weiß Survive R
The Wrong Way to Use Healing Magic
Yosuga no Sora
Yōjo Senki

References

External links
 Official website 

2005 establishments in Japan
Kadokawa Shoten magazines
Magazines established in 2005
Magazines published in Tokyo
Monthly manga magazines published in Japan
Video game magazines published in Japan